Nebria ovipennis is a species of ground beetle in the Nebriinae subfamily that is endemic to the US state of California.

References

External links
Nebria ovipennis on Bug Guide

ovipennis
Beetles described in 1878
Beetles of North America
Endemic fauna of California
Fauna without expected TNC conservation status